Bayram or Bairam or Beyram may refer to:

 Bayram (Turkey), the Turkish word for a festival or celebration
 Bayrami (Bayramilik and Bayramiye), a Sufi order
 Public holidays in Azerbaijan

People
Bayram (name)

Places
 Bayram, Baghlan, Afghanistan
 Beyram, Iran, a city in Fars Province, Iran
 Bairam, East Azerbaijan, a village in East Azerbaijan Province, Iran
 Bayram, East Azerbaijan, a village in East Azerbaijan Province, Iran
 Beyram, Kerman, a village in Kerman Province, Iran
 Beyram, West Azerbaijan, a village in West Azerbaijan Province, Iran
 Beyram District, an administrative subdivision of Fars Province
 Beyram Rural District, an administrative subdivision of Fars Province

See also

 Bajrami